Speaking in Drums is the third and to date final solo studio album by American rock musician Joe Vitale. The album is a collection of eleven songs written and performed by Joe Vitale, his wife Susie Vitale, and his son Joe Vitale, Jr. among other guests.

The album's sound was inspired by music from his favorite legendary artists such as the Beach Boys, the Who, Phil Collins, Led Zeppelin, and the Beatles.

Track listing

References

External links
http://www.allmusic.com/album/speaking-in-drums-mw0001725335

2008 albums
Joe Vitale (musician) albums